Lerato Trevor Lamola (born 17 June 1986) is a South African soccer player who plays as a forward for Platinum City Rovers.

Early and personal life
He was born in Limpopo. He graduated with a degree in Logistics Management from Tshwane University of Technology in 2009.

Club career
After graduating from university, Lamola played for Tigers, Vardos and Roses United before joining Bloemfontein Celtic in June 2013. He signed for Lamontville Golden Arrows in 2016, before being released by the club in 2020.

International career
He made one appearance for the South Africa national football team in 2014.

References

1986 births
Living people
South African soccer players
South Africa international soccer players
Soccer players from Limpopo
Association football forwards
Roses United F.C. players
Bloemfontein Celtic F.C. players
Lamontville Golden Arrows F.C. players
Marumo Gallants F.C. players
South African Premier Division players
National First Division players
Tshwane University of Technology alumni